Rupen River is a river in Gujarat in western India whose origin is the Taranga hills near Kheralu taluka of Mehsana district in Gujarat at an elevation of 180 m above Mean Sea Level and descends in South Western direction. Its drainage basin has a maximum length of 156 km.

The Rupen River does not meet the ocean; it dries up in the Rann of Kutch.

It is a Northern basin of Gujarat. It is situated approximately between 230 25’ to 240 00’ North latitude and 71 0 30’ to 720 46’ East longitude.

Rupen river has three bank tributaries; two right and one left.  The right two tributaries are Pushpavathi and Khari.  These drain nearly 24.6% of total catchment area of Rupen river ( 2500 sq. km).  The left tributary is mostly the Khari river.  The right side of the river is flows more actively as compared to the left side of the river. So the drainage system is more extensive on the right bank area. 

Pushpavathi i.e., the main right tributary of Rupen river arises upstream from hilly area of Balad village of Kheralu taluk, in Mahesana ( Gujarat District) at an elevation of 183 m above Mean Sea Level.  So, Pusphavathi meets Rupen river at upstream of Sapawada village.

References 

Rivers of Gujarat
Rivers of India